Charles Chan is a Singaporean businessman, known for introducing his brother's Larry Jewelry to Singapore with his spouse. He retired from the business in July 2013.

Early life and career
Chan was born to a family of four sisters and two brothers. His parents were goldsmiths. Initially from Hong Kong, Chan's family moved for a time to Indonesia, but returned when that country was rife with violent riots and protests. His father, Chan Chung Yan, attempted a number of business ventures, persisting despite failure, which allowed the family to retain their prior lifestyle. As a young child, Chan and his siblings helped with their father's businesses—Chan remembers packing fake fruit and flowers for sale overseas. Chan attended the Imperial College in London, England, where he studied electrical engineering.

Chan dropped out before graduating in order to return to Hong Kong to help his elder brother with his jewellery store, Larry Jewelry. Larry, who was ill, had founded the business in 1967 on Peking Road. Chan became in charge of the business' expansion to Singapore, alongside his wife Emmy. The first Larry Jewelry outlet in Singapore opened in 1975 at the Orchard Towers. The business grew in popularity, opening its third outlet in 1981. In 2010, Larry Jewelry was purchased by Eternite International for HK$400,000,000. Afterward, Chan served as the general manager of the Singapore business until his retirement on July 31, 2013.

Personal life
Chan married Emmy, a bank accountant, in 1975. They have one son. Chan refuses to wear rings on his fingers, despite being in the jewellery trade, because of an incident in which he broke his wedding band.

References

Singaporean people of Chinese descent
Singaporean business executives
Hong Kong emigrants to Singapore
Year of birth missing (living people)
Living people